The Aomori Curling Club is a curling club in Aomori, Japan.

Sports teams in Aomori (city)
Curling in Japan
Curling clubs